Jack Armstrong (1947) is a Columbia film serial, based on the radio adventure series Jack Armstrong, the All-American Boy.

Plot
Vic Hardy, a scientist working for Jim Fairfield's aviation company, is kidnapped by Jason Grood's gang after discovering radiation emitting from their secret island base.  Grood intends to conquer the world and forces Hardy to assist him.

Fairfield, along with his niece and nephew and, most importantly, the hero of the title, attempt to rescue Hardy and stop Grood's plans. They are assisted by the native tribe living on the island, led by Princess Alura.

Cast
 John Hart as Jack Armstrong
 Rosemary LaPlanche as Betty Fairfield
 Claire James as Princess Alura [Chs. 3-6,9-11, 15]
 Joe Brown, Jr. as Billy Fairfield (as Joe Brown)
 Pierre Watkin as Uncle Jim Fairfield
 Wheeler Oakman as Prof. Hobart Zorn
 Jack Ingram as Henchman Blair
 Eddie Parker as Henchman Slade
 Hugh Prosser as Vic Hardy

Chapter titles
 Mystery of the Cosmic Ray
 The Far World
 Island of Deception
 Into the Chasm
 The Space Ship
 Tunnels of Treachery
 Cavern of Chance
 The Secret Room
 Human Targets
 Battle of the Warriors
 Cosmic Annihilator
 The Grotto of Greed
 Wheels of Fate
 Journey into Space
 Retribution
Source:

See also
List of film serials by year
List of film serials by studio

References

External links
 
 
 Review of the VCI DVD at FulvueDrive-in.com

1947 films
1940s English-language films
American black-and-white films
1947 adventure films
Columbia Pictures film serials
Films based on radio series
Films directed by Wallace Fox
American adventure films
Films with screenplays by George H. Plympton
1940s American films